Midway is a borough in Washington County, Pennsylvania, United States. The population was 921 at the 2020 census. The community gained its name from being the midpoint, or "mid-way" stop along the railroad between Pittsburgh, Pennsylvania and Steubenville, Ohio.

Geography
Midway is located at  (40.368154, -80.292409).

According to the United States Census Bureau, the borough has a total area of 0.4 square mile (1.1 km2), all  land.

Surrounding neighborhoods
Midway has two borders: with the townships of Robinson to the north, east and west, and Smith to the south.

Demographics

As of the census of 2000, there were 982 people, 411 households, and 295 families living in the borough. The population density was 2,225.0 people per square mile (861.7/km2). There were 431 housing units at an average density of 976.6/sq mi (378.2/km2). The racial makeup of the borough was 98.88% White, 0.51% African American, 0.20% Asian, and 0.41% from two or more races. Hispanic or Latino of any race were 0.61% of the population.

There were 411 households, out of which 28.0% had children under the age of 18 living with them, 56.0% were married couples living together, 12.7% had a female householder with no husband present, and 28.0% were non-families. 25.3% of all households were made up of individuals, and 12.4% had someone living alone who was 65 years of age or older. The average household size was 2.39 and the average family size was 2.85.

In the borough the population was spread out, with 20.5% under the age of 18, 7.3% from 18 to 24, 28.0% from 25 to 44, 26.6% from 45 to 64, and 17.6% who were 65 years of age or older. The median age was 41 years. For every 100 females, there were 89.9 males. For every 100 females age 18 and over, there were 88.6 males.

The median income for a household in the borough was $36,078, and the median income for a family was $41,458. Males had a median income of $33,958 versus $22,404 for females. The per capita income for the borough was $17,783. About 5.5% of families and 8.1% of the population were below the poverty line, including 13.4% of those under age 18 and 7.2% of those age 65 or over.

Notable people
Ralph Felton, former NFL player for the Washington Redskins
Dick Haley, former NFL football player and Player Personnel Director of the Pittsburgh Steelers and NY Jets.
 Grace Stoeckle, internet pioneer and former Director of Content at GSI Commerce.

References

Boroughs in Washington County, Pennsylvania
Populated places established in 1866
Pittsburgh metropolitan area
1866 establishments in Pennsylvania